Banapura railway station is a railway station in Narmadapuram district, Madhya Pradesh. Its code is BPF. It serves Banapura town. The station consists of two platforms. It lacks many facilities including water and sanitation. Passenger and Express trains halt here.

References

Railway stations in Narmadapuram district
Bhopal railway division